This is a list of supermarket chains in Morocco. 

 Acima (merged with Marjane Market)
 Aswak Assalam 
 Atacadao
 BIM
 Carrefour
 Carrefour Market
 Coté Marché
 Costcutter
 Happy Center
 Label' Vie Supermarkets
 Leader Price (Moroccan)
 Marjane

Former chains (defunct)
 Hanouty - ceased to trade, following financial collapse

See also
 List of supermarket chains in Africa
 List of supermarket chains

References

External links
 Grocery Retailers In Morocco - Report

Morocco

Business in Morocco
Supermarket chains
Morocco